Lakeview High School in Cortland, Ohio, is the only high school in the Lakeview School District. Prior to 2004, Lakeview High School taught grades eight through 12; in 2004, the 8th grade was moved to Lakeview Middle School. Since 2009, due to financial issues and the closing of Cortland Elementary School, Lakeview High School again accommodates grades eight to 12. Since the opening of the K-8 in the 2018-19 school year, Lakeview High School now teaches grades 9th through 12th. A new gymnasium, cafeteria, and band room were added in 1971, and Raidel Auditorium was constructed in 1996.

Demographics

As of 2010...

Academics
Excluding the eighth grade, Lakeview High School offers four years of math, science, English, social studies, and foreign languages (Spanish and French). Lakeview also offers art, band, and choir as electives. AP (Advanced Placement Program) classes are taught in Calculus and English, with Honors classes Physics and Spanish IV. Computers, Business, and Accounting (Personal Finance) is  integrated with humanities, and S.T.E.M. (Science, Technology, Engineering, and Math) will now be offered to 8th grade students.

Levy
Before May 2010, the Lakeview School District had not been able to pass a levy since 1999.  As a result, the district neared debt and the school has undergone many program cuts, including the removal of busing to the state minimum and pay-to-participate sports. However, a 3.75-mill levy passed on May 4, 2010, by two votes, finally clearing Lakeview of its eleven-year-long levy drought. In a following levy in 2015, it passed again, and granting Lakeview the opportunity to build a new building, which will contain K-8

Athletics
Lakeview provides the following athletic activities for its students:
Boys football
Boys and girls cross country
Boys and girls soccer
Girls volleyball
Boys and girls basketball
Boys and girls bowling
Boys baseball
Girls softball
Boys and girls track and field
Boys and girls golf
Boys and girls tennis
Boys and girls swimming and diving (unofficially)
Cheerleading

Ohio High School Athletic Association state championships

 Boys track and field – 1970
 Boys cross country – 1967, 1968
 Girls golf (Division II) – 2015

Music
Lakeview High School provides a band program, directed by Nathan Sensabaugh, a choral program, directed by Bonnie Chronister, a music theory class for its students, taught by Chronister, and a music appreciation class, taught by Sensabaugh.

Band

There are several bands, formerly directed by Russ Girt, A. Sam Core and Ken Young, currently directed by Nathan Sensabaugh, in which students can perform, including marching band, concert band, symphonic band, two jazz bands, pep band, and a "graduation band" that plays at commencement.

The marching band plays for all football games, performs at band nights annually, and participates in the Cortland Street Fair Parade every June. During the last week of July, the Lakeview band goes to band camp (previously at Hiram College) in order to prepare for the band's shows.

At the Ohio Music Education Association district contest, held in the spring, the Lakeview Symphonic Band has received 35 "I" (superior) ratings out of the last 36 years, performing originally in B class, then moving up to A class. The Concert Band, performing in Festival Class (no rating), and then in D class, has been in existence from the early 1990s. They have performed admirably at these contests as well. If a "I" is achieved by the Symphonic Band at districts, they then proceed to the state contest, held in April, which they have received more than 20 "I" ratings.

The band also attends out-of-state festivals and competitions almost every year including Disney World, Chicago, Cincinnati, Williamsburg, and various others. The band's success has attracted numerous groups to perform at the school's 850-seat Raidel Auditorium including the Notre Dame Symphonic Band.

Choir
There are several choirs, directed by Bonnie Chronister (formerly by Jane Page), in which students perform, including a concert choir, Advanced Women's Choir, and Madrigals. Page had been at Lakeview since 1976 and built an extremely successful choral program. The Madrigal group, also known as the Chamber Singers in the spring semester, has performed a Madrigal Feaste during the Christmas season since 1984 in the school's cafeteria. The event is extremely popular and tickets sell out very early.

In the past few years, the Chamber Singers have been attending OMEA's district and state contest and have received straight "I"s ("superior") every year. During the 2005-2006 school year, the group switched from performing Class A music to Class AA music (the hardest classification of music). Only a few choirs in the state perform this level of repertoire.

Page has also taught students that have gone to study music at prestigious colleges including Westminster Choir College and others. She has also taught students that have continued on to become part of outstanding college choirs including but not limited to Ohio University's "The Singing Men of Ohio" and Ohio State University's "Chorale". In recognition of her work, Jane Page was awarded "Outstanding Music Educator of the Year" by OMEA and was given a plaque during the 2005 convention in Cincinnati.

Notable alumni
Eric Stocz (Detroit Lions tight end, 1996–1998)
Johnny Ace Palmer (magician)

Notes and references

External links
 District Website
 Band Website
 Choir Website

High schools in Trumbull County, Ohio
Educational institutions established in 1961
Public high schools in Ohio
1961 establishments in Ohio